AHTS-001 is the first extended play by the collaborative music project All Hail the Silence, consisting of musician BT and singer Christian Burns. It was released on September 19, 2016, as a four-track limited edition colored 12" vinyl collectible disc by Shopify. It was later released on iTunes on December 16, 2016.

Track listing

Vinyl release

Digital release

References

External links 

All Hail the Silence official website

BT (musician) EPs
All Hail the Silence albums
2016 debut EPs
Electronic EPs